Stunt Driver is a polygonal racing game released for MS-DOS in 1990. It has a feature set similar to Brøderbund's Stunts published the same year, including a track editor, and both games have much in common with Hard Drivin', the Atari Games 3D stunt driving simulator released in February 1989.

Gameplay
Stunt Driver allows the user to create a racetrack from components such as draw-bridges, banked curves, oil slicks, water hazards, and loops, then race on them alone, against computer-controlled opponents, or against another user via a modem or null-modem connection. It allows viewing and editing of replays using different cameras, another feature shared with Stunts.

Reception
Computer Gaming World praised Stunt Drivers game play and performance, sound card audio, and extensive customization options, and stated that it was a good computer counterpart to Atari's Hard Drivin' arcade game.

See also 
 Hard Drivin' (1989)
 Stunt Car Racer (1989)
Stunts (1990)

References

External links
Stunt Driver at GameFAQs

1990 video games
DOS games
DOS-only games
North America-exclusive video games
Racing video games
Multiplayer null modem games
Multiplayer online games
Spectrum HoloByte games
Video games developed in the United States